The1976 Fiji rugby union tour of Australia was a series of matches played between May and June 1976 by the Fiji national rugby union team in Australia.

Three test were played, all won by "Wallabies"

Results

Scores and results list Fiji's points tally first.

Fiji
Fiji national rugby union team tours
tour
Rugby union tours of Australia